Village on Wheels refer to trains introduced by the Indian Railways to cater to budget tourists, especially villagers. The trains connect the selected tourist destinations, usually with a circular schedule. They are managed by Indian Railway Catering and Tourism Corporation (IRCTC), a public-sector undertaking of the Railways.

This is envisaged to be the more plebeian version of the luxurious Palace on Wheels trains.

'The train is aimed at promoting tourism and connecting one city to another' says the railways official 'the first nine-day journey will cost Rs. 4,500 inclusive of lacto-vegetarian meals and snacks'

 The first route is Rajendra Nagar(start)-Patna-Varanasi-Agra-Mathura-Delhi-Vaishno Devi(Jammu Tawi)-Amritsar-Haridwar(Rishikesh)-Patna -Rajendra Nagar(finish) in nine days.
 The second route is Patna (start)-Mokama-Jasidih-Asansol-Bardhaman-Howrah-Puri-Howrah-Asansol-Patna(finish) in six days.
 The third route is Howrah-Patna-Manmad(Shirdi)-Pune-Mumbai-Ahmedabad-Dwarka-Veraval-Ajmer-Jaipur-Delhi-Patna-Howrah(finish) in twelve days.
 The fourth route is Patna(start)-Howrah-Puri-Tirupati-Madurai-Rameshwaram-Kanyakumari-Thiruvananthapuram-Ernakulam-Howrah-Patna(finish) in twelve days
The fifth route is Patna(start) - Prayagraj - Satna - Katni - Jabalpur - Narsinghpur - Itarsi - Narmadapuram - Bhopal Habibganj - Bhopal Junction - Bhopal Bairagarh - Maksi Junction - Ujjain - Dewas - Indore Junction BG (Indore) - Patna (finish) in 12 days

External links
  Village on Wheels on its way next week
  Lalu to flag-off 'Village On Wheels'

Luxury trains in India
Tourism in India
Rural development in India